Gurahi (also Romanized as Gūrahī; also known as Gara”ī) is a village in Gavkan Rural District, in the Central District of Rigan County, Kerman Province, Iran. At the 2006 census, its population was 161, in 42 families.

References 

Populated places in Rigan County